The 2010 Judo Grand Prix Rotterdam was held in Rotterdam, Netherlands from 15 to 17 October 2010.

Medal summary

Men's events

Women's events

Source Results

Medal table

References

External links
 

2010 IJF World Tour
2010 Judo Grand Prix
Judo
Judo competitions in the Netherlands
Judo
Judo